Richard Cheek (born January 19, 1948) is a former American football guard. He played for the Buffalo Bills in 1970.

References

1948 births
Living people
American football guards
Auburn Tigers football players
Buffalo Bills players